Richard "Rick" Gay (born 27 October 1983) is a Welsh field hockey player.

He represented Wales in the 2014 Commonwealth Games in Glasgow. He previously represented South Africa before switching affiliation to Wales in 2008.

He has played club hockey for Southgate and East Grinstead

References

External links

Welsh male field hockey players
Commonwealth Games competitors for Wales
Field hockey players at the 2014 Commonwealth Games
1983 births
Living people
East Grinstead Hockey Club players
Southgate Hockey Club players
South African male field hockey players